"Grew Up On That" is a song  recorded by Canadian country music group High Valley. The track was co-written by the band's lead singer Brad Rempel with Ben Stennis and Jaron Boyer. It was the lead single and title track off their third extended play Grew Up On That.

Critical reception
Carena Liptak of Taste of Country said "the lyrics of the song take fans through the bandmates' childhoods in rural Alberta, Canada, with references that are both intensely specific and universal enough to tug at the heartstrings of any listener".

Commercial performance
"Grew Up On That" was certified Gold by Music Canada on October 19, 2020. As of December 2020, "Grew Up On That" had received over 22.9 million streams through Spotify.

Music video
The official music video for "Grew Up On That" was directed by Benno Nelson and Sam Siske and premiered April 24, 2020. The video integrates films and photos from the Rempels' childhood and upbringing in La Crete, Alberta.

Chart performance
"Grew Up On That" reached a peak of number 1 on the Billboard Canada Country chart dated August 15, 2020, their second chart-topper after "I Be U Be". It also peaked at number 65 on the Billboard Canadian Hot 100.

Certifications

References

2020 songs
2020 singles
High Valley songs
Warner Music Group singles
Songs written by Brad Rempel
Songs written by Ben Stennis
Songs written by Jaron Boyer